Holger Waldenberger (born 7 December 1967) is a German professional quiz player. He won the individual title in the European Quizzing Championships in 2012.

Waldenberger was born at Bielefeld. He has been the best German quizzer at the World Quizzing Championship four times between 2009 and 2012. In 2012 he placed 13th worldwide, in 2011 he was 22nd and 2010 he was 24th. In 2011 he became the first German to win an IQA medal when his club Europalia, made up of members from four countries, won Silver in Bruges.

In July 2012 he got his first television-appearance as "Chaser" (German: Jäger) in the NDR-Show Gefragt – Gejagt for all the first six episodes of the German remake of the British quiz show The Chase, then he re-appeared in the ARD version of the show from May 2015 to April 2017. In November 2012 Waldenberger became the first German EQC-Individuals-Champion in Tartu (Estonia). Besides this unexpected success he finished third in the pairs-discipline with Dorjana Širola and second in the team competition with Europalia. In 2021, he retired from quizzing.

External links
 „Gefragt - gejagt“ in NDR:  (German)
 www.quizmeisterschaften.de Holger Waldenberger's private website (German)

References 

Quiz championship players
Sportspeople from Bielefeld
Living people
1967 births